Parischasia chamenoisi is a species of beetle in the family Cerambycidae. It was described by Tavakilian and Peñaherrera-Leiva in 2005.

References

Rhinotragini
Beetles described in 2005